Vector Foiltec is a  business using transparent plastic (ETFE) cushions filled with air as an architectural cladding technology. This solution can be better than glass panels in applications such as roofs over aggressive environments where chemicals would attack a metal window frame, or where the transparent panels have to accommodate deformation due to changing thermal conditions.

History
The Company was founded by Stefan Lehnert in 1982 in Bremen in Germany. Its first structure was the roof of a small pavilion at Burgers' Zoo in 1982.

Operations
The Texlon ETFE cladding system developed by the company consists of a number of layers of the UV stable copolymer ethylene tetrafluoroethylene (ETFE) welded into cushions or foils.  The cushions are restrained around their perimeter by aluminium extrusions, which are in turn fastened to a supporting primary structure. The cushions are inflated with air at low pressure to provide insulation and to resist wear caused by wind.

A Texlon ETFE cushion typically consists of two layers, although more layers can be added to enhance the cladding's insulation properties. Each layer can be modified with a variety of treatments to alter its aesthetic quality, its apparent transparency, and the level of solar gain. The material's innate toughness, resistance to tearing, and ability to work harden over a 300-400% elongation range allow Texlon to endure significant deformation of its support structure.

Major projects

Major projects include:
Eden Project, UK, completed 2001
Art Center College of Design, California, completed 2004
Southern Cross station, Australia, completed 2006
Beijing National Aquatics Centre, China, completed 2007
Eden Park, Auckland, New Zealand, completed 2010
Forsyth Barr Stadium, Dunedin, New Zealand, completed 2011
San Mamés Stadium, Bilbao, Spain, completed 2014
Anaheim Regional Transportation Intermodal Center, Anaheim, California, completed 2014
Singapore Sports Hub, SG, completed 2014
U.S. Bank Stadium, Minneapolis, completed 2016
The Avenues (Kuwait), Kuwait, ongoing since 2012

References

External links
Official site

Construction and civil engineering companies of Germany
Construction and civil engineering companies established in 1982
German  companies established in 1982